Fathabad-e Sofla may refer to:
 Fathabad-e Sofla, Marvdasht
 Fathabad-e Sofla, Shiraz